Alge may refer to:
 Alge, Ethiopia, a town in Alge Sache

People with the given name
 Alge Crumpler (born 1977), American former football tight end 
 Alge Gissing (1860–1937), English novelist

See also
 Algae, a group of eukaryotic organisms
 Algea, a Norwegian multinational operating in the chemical industry and man
 Algés (disambiguation)
 Algy, a masculine given name